Krasny Yar is a rural locality (a selo) and the administrative center of Chapayevsky Selsoviet of Aleysky District, Altai Krai, Russia. The population was 510 as of 2016. There are 11 streets.

Geography 
Krasny Yar is located on the left bank of the Aley River, 22 km southeast of Aleysk (the district's administrative centre) by road. Kashino is the nearest rural locality.

Ethnicity 
The village is inhabited by Russians and others.

References 

Rural localities in Aleysky District